Nipple Peak is a  peak standing  north-east of Channel Glacier in the northern part of Wiencke Island, in the Palmer Archipelago of Antarctica. It was discovered by the Belgian Antarctic Expedition, 1897–99, under Adrien de Gerlache. The name, which suggests the shape of the feature, was given by the Falkland Islands Dependencies Survey (FIDS) who mapped the peak in 1944.

References

Mountains of the Palmer Archipelago
Wiencke Island